United Democratic Serbia was a liberal and Pro-European political coalition in Serbia that participated in the 2020 parliamentary election. The coalition was headed by Marko Đurišić, the President of Serbia 21.

History
Political parties that were a part of this coalition were: Serbia 21, Party of Modern Serbia, Civic Democratic Forum, League of Social Democrats of Vojvodina, Vojvodina's Party, Montenegrin Party, Democratic Alliance of Croats in Vojvodina, Together for Vojvodina and the Union of Romanians of Serbia.

This coalition was formed with a goal to accelerate the integration of Serbia into EU, euroatlantic integrations, to form good relations with the Western powers and resolve the Kosovo question.

Members

Election result

References 

Defunct political party alliances in Serbia
Anti-nationalism in Europe